James J. Murakami (June 4, 1931 – December 15, 2022) was an American art director and production designer.

Murakami won an Emmy Award in 2006 for his work on the television series Deadwood.

In 2008, Murakami was nominated for an Academy Award for Best Art Direction for his work on the film Changeling (2008).

Murakami was recognized by the Art Directors Guild in 2018 as the recipient of the year's ADG Award for Lifetime Achievement.

Murakami worked on a number of Clint Eastwood films, including Invictus (2009), Hereafter (2010), and J. Edgar (2011).

Murakami died in Ronald Reagan UCLA Medical Center, Los Angeles on December 15, 2022, at the age of 91.

Selected filmography

Films
 Apocalypse Now (1979)
 WarGames (1983)
 Midnight Run (1988)
 Beverly Hills Cop (1984)
 Unforgiven (1992)
 True Romance (1993)
 The Game (1997)
 The Scorpion King (2002)
 Rails & Ties (2007)
 Changeling (2008)
 Gran Torino (2008)
 Invictus (2009)
 Hereafter (2010)
 J. Edgar (2011)
 Trouble with the Curve (2012)
 American Sniper (2014)
 Sully (2016)

Television
 Battlestar Galactica (1978)
 Charmed (2000)
 Deadwood (2004–2005)

References

External links

1931 births
2022 deaths
American production designers
Emmy Award winners
People from Sacramento, California